The 2015–16 Pittsburgh Penguins season was the 49th season for the National Hockey League franchise that was established on June 5, 1967. Their regular season games began on October 8, 2015 against the Dallas Stars. On December 12, the team had a record of 15–10–3. The organization then fired head coach Mike Johnston and replaced him with Mike Sullivan, head coach of the organization's American Hockey League affiliate in Wilkes-Barre.

The Penguins qualified for the playoffs for the tenth consecutive season. They earned second place in the Metropolitan Division with 104 points. They began the 2016 Stanley Cup playoffs on April 13 against the New York Rangers, the team they were eliminated by in the Stanley Cup playoffs both of the previous two seasons. They went on to beat the Rangers in five games. In the second round the Pens defeated the Washington Capitals, the winners of the Presidents' Trophy, in six games. The team then played in their first Eastern Conference Finals since 2013 against the Tampa Bay Lightning. The Pens defeated the Lightning in seven games, despite trailing the series 3–2 after Game 5, to earn the franchise's fifth berth in the Stanley Cup Finals. In the Finals, the Penguins defeated the San Jose Sharks in six games to win the franchise's fourth league title.

Pre-season

Game log 

|-  style="text-align:center; background:#cfc;"
| 1 || Sept. 21 || Pittsburgh Penguins || 1–0 SO || Columbus Blue Jackets || 11,363 || 1–0–0
|-  style="text-align:center; background:#cfc;"
| 2 || Sept. 22 || Carolina Hurricanes || 3–7 || Pittsburgh Penguins || 17,781 || 2–0–0
|-  style="text-align:center; background:#fcf;"
| 3 || Sept. 24 || Pittsburgh Penguins || 1–6 || Detroit Red Wings || 15,677 || 2–1–0
|-  style="text-align:center; background:#fcf;"
| 4 || Sept. 26 || Columbus Blue Jackets || 4–2 || Pittsburgh Penguins || 18,265 || 2–2–0
|-  style="text-align:center; background:#fcf;"
|  || Sept. 28 || Pittsburgh Penguins || 1–4 || Montreal Canadiens || –– || 2–3–0
|-  style="text-align:center; background:#cfc;"
|  || Sept. 29 || Tampa Bay Lightning || 2–4 || Pittsburgh Penguins || –– || 3–3–0
|-  style="text-align:center; background:#fcf;"
| 9 || Sept. 30 || Detroit Red Wings || 7–2 || Pittsburgh Penguins || 18,207 || 3–4–0
|-  style="text-align:center; background:#fcf;"
| 8 || Oct. 2 || Pittsburgh Penguins || 1–2 || Carolina Hurricanes || 7,986 || 3–5–0
|-

|- style="text-align:center;"
| Legend:       = Win       = Loss       = OT/SO LossKraft Hockeyville game

Statistics 
Final
Note – Statistics compiled from Official Game/Event Summaries from NHL.com

Regular season

Game log 

|-  style="text-align:center; background:#fcf;"
| 1 || 8 || 8:30 pm || Pittsburgh Penguins || 0–3 || Dallas Stars || American Airlines Center (18,532) || 0–1–0 || 0
|-  style="text-align:center; background:#fcf;"
| 2 || 10 || 10:00 pm || Pittsburgh Penguins || 1–2 || Arizona Coyotes || Gila River Arena (17,125) || 0–2–0 || 0
|-  style="text-align:center; background:#fcf;"
| 3 || 13 || 7:00 pm || Montreal Canadiens || 3–2 || Pittsburgh Penguins || Consol Energy Center (18,626) || 0–3–0 || 0
|-  style="text-align:center; background:#cfc;"
| 4 || 15 || 7:00 pm || Ottawa Senators || 0–2 || Pittsburgh Penguins || Consol Energy Center (18,486) || 1–3–0 || 2
|-  style="text-align:center; background:#cfc;"
| 5 || 17 || 7:00 pm || Toronto Maple Leafs || 1–2 || Pittsburgh Penguins || Consol Energy Center (18,650) || 2–3–0 || 4
|-  style="text-align:center; background:#cfc;"
| 6 || 20 || 7:00 pm || Florida Panthers || 2–3 OT || Pittsburgh Penguins || Consol Energy Center (18,471) || 3–3–0 || 6
|-  style="text-align:center; background:#fcf;"
| 7 || 22 || 7:00 pm || Dallas Stars || 4–1 || Pittsburgh Penguins || Consol Energy Center (18,490) || 3–4–0 || 6
|-  style="text-align:center; background:#cfc;"
| 8 || 24 || 8:00 pm || Pittsburgh Penguins || 2–1 OT || Nashville Predators || Bridgestone Arena (17,163) || 4–4–0 || 8
|-  style="text-align:center; background:#cfc;"
| 9 || 28 || 8:00 pm || Pittsburgh Penguins || 3–1 || Washington Capitals || Verizon Center (18,506) || 5–4–0 || 10
|-  style="text-align:center; background:#cfc;"
| 10 || 29 || 7:00 pm || Buffalo Sabres || 3–4 || Pittsburgh Penguins || Consol Energy Center (18,415) || 6–4–0 || 12
|-  style="text-align:center; background:#cfc;"
| 11 || 31 || 7:00 pm || Pittsburgh Penguins || 4–0 || Toronto Maple Leafs || Air Canada Centre (19,197) || 7–4–0 || 14
|-

|-  style="text-align:center; background:#cfc;"
| 12 || 4 || 10:00 pm || Pittsburgh Penguins || 3–2 || Vancouver Canucks || Rogers Arena (18,570) || 8–4–0 || 16
|-  style="text-align:center; background:#cfc;"
| 13 || 6 || 9:00 pm || Pittsburgh Penguins ||  2–1 || Edmonton Oilers  || Rexall Place (16,839) || 9–4–0 || 18
|-  style="text-align:center; background:#fcf;"
| 14 || 7 || 10:00 pm || Pittsburgh Penguins || 2–5 || Calgary Flames || Scotiabank Saddledome (19,289) || 9–5–0 || 18
|-  style="text-align:center; background:#cfc;"
| 15 || 11 || 7:30 pm || Montreal Canadiens || 3–4 SO || Pittsburgh Penguins || Consol Energy Center (18,455) || 10–5–0 || 20
|-  style="text-align:center; background:#fcf;"
| 16 || 13 || 7:00 pm || Columbus Blue Jackets || 2–1 || Pittsburgh Penguins || Consol Energy Center (18,610) || 10–6–0 || 20
|-  style="text-align:center; background:#fcf;"
| 17 || 14 || 7:00 pm || Pittsburgh Penguins || 0–4 || New Jersey Devils || Prudential Center (16,514) || 10–7–0 || 20
|-  style="text-align:center; background:#cfc;"
| 18 || 17 || 7:30 pm || Minnesota Wild || 3–4 || Pittsburgh Penguins || Consol Energy Center (18,495) || 11–7–0 || 22
|-  style="text-align:center; background:#cfc;"
| 19 || 19 || 7:00 pm || Colorado Avalanche || 3–4 || Pittsburgh Penguins || Consol Energy Center (18,430) || 12–7–0 || 24
|-  style="text-align:center; background:#fcf;"
| 20 || 21 || 7:00 pm || San Jose Sharks || 3–1 || Pittsburgh Penguins || Consol Energy Center (18,534) || 12–8–0 || 24
|-  style="text-align:center; background:#cfc;"
| 21 || 25 || 7:00 pm || St. Louis Blues || 3–4 OT || Pittsburgh Penguins || Consol Energy Center (18,569) || 13–8–0 || 26
|-  style="text-align:center; background:#ffc;"
| 22 || 27 || 7:00 pm || Pittsburgh Penguins || 1–2 OT || Columbus Blue Jackets || Nationwide Arena (18,205) || 13–8–1 || 27
|-  style="text-align:center; background:#ffc;"
| 23 || 28 || 7:00 pm || Edmonton Oilers  || 3–2 SO || Pittsburgh Penguins || Consol Energy Center (18,656) || 13–8–2 || 28
|-

|-  style="text-align:center; background:#cfc;"
| 24 || 1 || 10:30 pm || Pittsburgh Penguins || 5–1 || San Jose Sharks || SAP Center at San Jose (16,624) || 14–8–2 || 30
|-  style="text-align:center; background:#fcf;"
| 25 || 5 || 4:00 pm || Pittsburgh Penguins || 3–5 || Los Angeles Kings || Staples Center (18,230) || 14–9–2 || 30
|-  style="text-align:center; background:#fcf;"
| 26 || 6 || 8:00 pm || Pittsburgh Penguins || 1–2 || Anaheim Ducks || Honda Center (15,836) || 14–10–2 || 30
|-  style="text-align:center; background:#cfc;"
| 27 || 9 || 10:00 pm || Pittsburgh Penguins || 4–2 || Colorado Avalanche || Pepsi Center (15,838) || 15–10–2 || 32
|-  style="text-align:center; background:#ffc; border-bottom:#000000 3px solid;"
| 28 || 11 || 7:00 pm || Los Angeles Kings || 3–2 SO || Pittsburgh Penguins || Consol Energy Center (18,489) || 15–10–3 || 33
|-  style="text-align:center; background:#fcf;"
| 29 || 14 || 7:00 pm || Washington Capitals || 4–1 || Pittsburgh Penguins || Consol Energy Center (18,520) || 15–11–3 || 33
|-  style="text-align:center; background:#fcf;"
| 30 || 16 || 8:00 pm || Pittsburgh Penguins || 0–3 || Boston Bruins || TD Garden (17,565) || 15–12–3 || 33
|-  style="text-align:center; background:#fcf;"
| 31 || 18 || 7:00 pm || Boston Bruins || 6–2 || Pittsburgh Penguins || Consol Energy Center (18,585) || 15–13–3 || 33
|-  style="text-align:center; background:#fcf;"
| 32 || 19 || 7:00 pm || Carolina Hurricanes || 2–1 || Pittsburgh Penguins || Consol Energy Center (18,590) || 15–14–3 || 33
|-  style="text-align:center; background:#cfc;"
| 33 || 21 || 7:00 pm || Columbus Blue Jackets || 2–5 || Pittsburgh Penguins || Consol Energy Center (18,602) || 16–14–3 || 35
|-  style="text-align:center; background:#cfc;"
| 34 || 26 || 8:00 pm || Pittsburgh Penguins || 3–1 || Minnesota Wild || Xcel Energy Center (19,234) || 17–14–3 || 37
|-  style="text-align:center; background:#fcf;"
| 35 || 27 || 8:00 pm || Pittsburgh Penguins || 0–1 || Winnipeg Jets || MTS Centre (15,294) || 17–15–3 || 37
|-  style="text-align:center; background:#ffc;
| 36 || 30 || 7:00 pm || Toronto Maple Leafs || 3–2 SO || Pittsburgh Penguins || Consol Energy Center (18,662) || 17–15–4 || 38
|-  style="text-align:center; background:#cfc;"
| 37 || 31 || 6:00 pm || Pittsburgh Penguins || 5–2 || Detroit Red Wings || Joe Louis Arena (20,027) || 18–15–4 || 40
|-
|colspan=9| Thick border represents transition between Head Coach Mike Johnston to Mike Sullivan.
|-

|-  style="text-align:center; background:#cfc;"
| 38 || 2 || 7:00 pm || New York Islanders || 2–5 || Pittsburgh Penguins || Consol Energy Center (18,665) || 19–15–4 || 42
|-  style="text-align:center; background:#ffc;
| 39 || 5 || 7:00 pm || Chicago Blackhawks  || 3–2 OT || Pittsburgh Penguins || Consol Energy Center (18,656) || 19–15–5 || 43
|-  style="text-align:center; background:#fcf;"
| 40 || 6 || 8:00 pm || Pittsburgh Penguins || 1–3 || Chicago Blackhawks  || United Center (21,908) || 19–16–5 || 43
|-  style="text-align:center; background:#cfc;"
| 41 || 9 || 7:00 pm || Pittsburgh Penguins || 3–1 || Montreal Canadiens || Bell Centre (21,288) || 20–16–5 || 45
|-  style="text-align:center; background:#ffc;
| 42 || 12 || 7:00 pm || Pittsburgh Penguins || 2–3 OT || Carolina Hurricanes || PNC Arena (13,012) || 20–16–6 || 46
|-  style="text-align:center; background:#ffc;
| 43 || 15 || 7:30 pm || Pittsburgh Penguins || 4–5 OT || Tampa Bay Lightning || Amalie Arena (19,092) || 20–16–7 || 47
|-  style="text-align:center; background:#cfc;"
| 44 || 17 || 3:00 pm || Carolina Hurricanes || 0–5 || Pittsburgh Penguins || Consol Energy Center (18,528) || 21–16–7 || 49
|-  style="text-align:center; background:#fcf;"
| 45 || 18 || 8:00 pm || Pittsburgh Penguins || 2–5 || St. Louis Blues || Scottrade Center (19,312) || 21–17–7 || 49 
|-  style="text-align:center; background:#cfc;"
| 46 || 21 || 7:00 pm || Philadelphia Flyers || 3–4 || Pittsburgh Penguins || Consol Energy Center (18,652) || 22–17–7 || 51 
|-  style="text-align:center; background:#cfc;"
| 47 || 23 || 12:30 pm || Vancouver Canucks || 4–5 || Pittsburgh Penguins || Consol Energy Center (18,539) || 23–17–7 || 53
|-  style="background:#ccc;"
| – || 24 || 12:30 pm ||colspan="6" | Game rescheduled to March 1 due to hazardous weather. 
|-  style="text-align:center; background:#cfc;"
| 48 || 26 || 7:00 pm || New Jersey Devils || 0–2 || Pittsburgh Penguins || Consol Energy Center (18,442) || 24–17–7 || 55
|-

|-  style="text-align:center; background:#cfc;"
| 49 || 2 || 7:00 pm || Ottawa Senators || 5–6 || Pittsburgh Penguins || Consol Energy Center (18,420) || 25–17–7 || 57
|-  style="text-align:center; background:#fcf;"
| 50 || 5 || 7:30 pm || Pittsburgh Penguins || 3–6 || Tampa Bay Lightning || Amalie Arena (19,092) || 25–18–7 || 57
|-  style="text-align:center; background:#cfc;"
| 51 || 6 || 7:00 pm || Pittsburgh Penguins || 3–2 OT || Florida Panthers || BB&T Center (20,295) || 26–18–7 || 59 
|-  style="text-align:center; background:#cfc;"
| 52 || 8 || 7:00 pm || Anaheim Ducks || 2–6 || Pittsburgh Penguins || Consol Energy Center (18,418) || 27–18–7 || 61
|-  style="text-align:center; background:#fcf;"
| 53 || 10 || 8:00 pm || New York Rangers || 3–0 || Pittsburgh Penguins || Consol Energy Center (18,539) || 27–19–7 || 61
|-  style="text-align:center; background:#cfc;"
| 54 || 12 || 7:00 pm || Pittsburgh Penguins || 2–1 SO || Carolina Hurricanes || PNC Arena (15,783) || 28–19–7 || 63
|-  style="text-align:center; background:#ffc;
| 55 || 15 || 7:30 pm || Pittsburgh Penguins || 1–2 SO || Florida Panthers || BB&T Center (15,595) || 28–19–8 || 64
|-  style="text-align:center; background:#cfc;"
| 56 || 18 || 7:00 pm || Detroit Red Wings || 3–6 || Pittsburgh Penguins || Consol Energy Center (18,584) || 29–19–8 || 66
|-  style="text-align:center; background:#fcf;"
| 57 || 20 || 12:30 pm || Tampa Bay Lightning || 4–2 || Pittsburgh Penguins || Consol Energy Center (18,643) || 29–20–8 || 66
|-  style="text-align:center; background:#cfc;"
| 58 || 21 || 12:30 pm || Pittsburgh Penguins || 4–3 || Buffalo Sabres || First Niagara Center (19,070) || 30–20–8 || 68
|-  style="text-align:center; background:#fcf;"
| 59 || 24 || 7:30 pm || Pittsburgh Penguins || 1–5 || Boston Bruins || TD Garden (17,565) || 30–21–8 || 68
|-  style="text-align:center; background:#cfc;"
| 60 || 27 || 3:00 pm || Winnipeg Jets || 1–4 || Pittsburgh Penguins || Consol Energy Center (18,650) || 31–21–8 || 70
|-  style="text-align:center; background:#cfc;"
| 61 || 29 || 7:00 pm || Arizona Coyotes || 0–6 || Pittsburgh Penguins || Consol Energy Center (18,435) || 32–21–8 || 72
|-

|-  style="text-align:center; background:#fcf;"
| 62 || 1 || 7:30 pm || Pittsburgh Penguins || 2–3 || Washington Capitals || Verizon Center (18,506) || 32–22–8 || 72
|-  style="text-align:center; background:#cfc;"
| 63 || 3 || 7:00 pm || New York Rangers || 1–4 || Pittsburgh Penguins || Consol Energy Center (18,492) || 33–22–8 || 74
|-  style="text-align:center; background:#fcf;"
| 64 || 5 || 3:00 pm || Calgary Flames || 4–2 || Pittsburgh Penguins || Consol Energy Center (18,663) || 33–23–8 || 74
|-  style="text-align:center; background:#cfc;"
| 65 || 6 || 5:00 pm || Pittsburgh Penguins || 6–1 || New Jersey Devils || Prudential Center (15,856) || 34–23–8 || 76
|-  style="text-align:center; background:#fcf;"
| 66 || 8 || 7:30 pm || Pittsburgh Penguins || 1–2 || New York Islanders || Barclays Center (14,724) || 34–24–8 || 76
|-  style="text-align:center; background:#cfc;"
| 67 || 11 || 7:00 pm || Pittsburgh Penguins || 3–2 || Columbus Blue Jackets || Nationwide Arena (18,205) || 35–24–8 || 78
|-  style="text-align:center; background:#cfc;"
| 68 || 13 || 12:30 pm || Pittsburgh Penguins || 5–3 || New York Rangers || Madison Square Garden (IV) (18,006) || 36–24–8 || 80
|-  style="text-align:center; background:#cfc;"
| 69 || 15 || 7:00 pm || New York Islanders || 1–2 SO || Pittsburgh Penguins || Consol Energy Center (18,456) || 37–24–8 || 82
|-  style="text-align:center; background:#cfc;"
| 70 || 17 || 7:00 pm || Carolina Hurricanes || 2–4 || Pittsburgh Penguins || Consol Energy Center (18,455) || 38–24–8 || 84
|-  style="text-align:center; background:#cfc;"
| 71 || 19 || 1:00 pm || Pittsburgh Penguins || 4–1 || Philadelphia Flyers || Wells Fargo Center (19,967) || 39–24–8 || 86
|-  style="text-align:center; background:#cfc;"
| 72 || 20 || 6:00 pm || Washington Capitals || 2–6 || Pittsburgh Penguins || Consol Energy Center (18,656) || 40–24–8 || 88
|-  style="text-align:center; background:#fcf;"
| 73 || 24 || 7:00 pm || New Jersey Devils || 3–0 || Pittsburgh Penguins || Consol Energy Center (18,610) || 40–25–8 || 88
|-  style="text-align:center; background:#cfc;"
| 74 || 26 || 2:00 pm || Pittsburgh Penguins || 7–2 || Detroit Red Wings || Joe Louis Arena (20,027) || 41–25–8 || 90
|-  style="text-align:center; background:#cfc;"
| 75 || 27 || 7:30 pm || Pittsburgh Penguins || 3–2 OT || New York Rangers || Madison Square Garden (IV) (18,006) || 42–25–8 || 92
|-  style="text-align:center; background:#cfc;"
| 76 || 29 || 7:00 pm || Buffalo Sabres || 4–5 SO || Pittsburgh Penguins || Consol Energy Center (18,513) || 43–25–8 || 94
|-  style="text-align:center; background:#cfc;"
| 77 || 31 || 7:00 pm || Nashville Predators || 2–5 || Pittsburgh Penguins || Consol Energy Center (18,560) || 44–25–8 || 96
|-

|-  style="text-align:center; background:#cfc;"
| 78 || 2 || 1:00 pm || Pittsburgh Penguins || 5–0 || New York Islanders || Barclays Center (15,795) || 45–25–8 || 98
|-  style="text-align:center; background:#cfc;"
| 79 || 3 || 3:00 pm || Philadelphia Flyers || 2–6 || Pittsburgh Penguins || Consol Energy Center (18,673) || 46–25–8 || 100
|-  style="text-align:center; background:#cfc;"
| 80 || 5 || 7:30 pm || Pittsburgh Penguins || 5–3 || Ottawa Senators || Canadian Tire Centre (19,284) || 47–25–8 || 102
|-  style="text-align:center; background:#cfc;"
| 81 || 7 || 7:00 pm || Pittsburgh Penguins || 4–3 OT || Washington Capitals || Verizon Center (18,506) || 48–25–8 || 104
|-  style="text-align:center; background:#fcf;"
| 82 || 9 || 3:00 pm || Pittsburgh Penguins || 1–3 || Philadelphia Flyers || Wells Fargo Center (19,919) || 48–26–8 || 104
|-

|- style="text-align:center;"
| Legend:       = Win       = Loss       = OT/SO Loss– Alternate Jersey

Season standings

Detailed records 
Final

Injuries

Playoffs 

The Penguins announced on April 11, 2016 that they will wear their Alternate jersey for all home games throughout the Stanley Cup Playoffs.

Game log 

|- style="background:#cfc;"
| 1 || April 13 || New York || 2–5 || Pittsburgh || || Zatkoff || 18,588 || 1–0 || Recap
|- style="background:#fcf;"
| 2 || April 16 || New York || 4–2 || Pittsburgh || || Zatkoff || 18,614 || 1–1 || Recap
|- style="background:#cfc;"
| 3 || April 19 || Pittsburgh || 3–1 || New York || || Murray || 18,006 || 2–1 || Recap
|- style="background:#cfc;"
| 4 || April 21 || Pittsburgh || 5–0 || New York || || Murray || 18,006 || 3–1 || Recap
|- style="background:#cff;"
| 5 || April 23 || New York || 3–6 || Pittsburgh || || Murray || 18,607 || 4–1 || Recap
|-

|- style="background:#fcf;"
| 1 || April 28 || Pittsburgh || 3–4 || Washington || OT || Murray || 18,506 || 0–1 || Recap
|- style="background:#cfc;"
| 2 || April 30 || Pittsburgh || 2–1 || Washington || || Murray || 18,506 || 1–1 || Recap
|- style="background:#cfc;"
| 3 || May 2 || Washington || 2–3 || Pittsburgh || || Murray || 18,601 || 2–1 || Recap
|- style="background:#cfc;"
| 4 || May 4 || Washington || 2–3 || Pittsburgh || OT || Murray || 18,614 || 3–1 || Recap 
|- style="background:#fcf;"
| 5 || May 7 || Pittsburgh || 1–3 || Washington || || Murray || 18,506 || 3–2 || Recap 
|- style="background:#cff;"
| 6 || May 10 || Washington || 3–4 || Pittsburgh || OT || Murray || 18,650 || 4–2 || Recap
|-

|- style="background:#fcf;"
| 1 || May 13 || Tampa Bay || 3–1 || Pittsburgh || || Murray || 18,554 || 0–1 || Recap
|- style="background:#cfc;"
| 2 || May 16 || Tampa Bay || 2–3 || Pittsburgh || OT || Murray || 18,534 || 1–1 || Recap
|- style="background:#cfc;"
| 3 || May 18 || Pittsburgh || 4–2 || Tampa Bay || || Murray || 19,092 || 2–1 || Recap
|- style="background:#fcf;"
| 4 || May 20 || Pittsburgh || 3–4 || Tampa Bay || || Murray || 19,092 || 2–2 || Recap
|- style="background:#fcf;"
| 5 || May 22 || Tampa Bay || 4–3 || Pittsburgh || OT || Fleury || 18,648 || 2–3 || Recap
|- style="background:#cfc;"
| 6 || May 24 || Pittsburgh || 5–2 || Tampa Bay || || Murray || 19,092 || 3–3 || Recap
|- style="background:#cff;"
| 7 || May 26 || Tampa Bay || 1–2 || Pittsburgh || || Murray || 18,638 || 4–3 || Recap
|-

|- style="background:#cfc;"
| 1 || May 30 || San Jose || 2–3 || Pittsburgh || || Murray || 18,596 || 1–0 || Recap
|- style="background:#cfc;"
| 2 || June 1 || San Jose|| 1–2 || Pittsburgh || OT || Murray || 18,655 || 2–0 || Recap 
|- style="background:#fcf;"
| 3 || June 4 || Pittsburgh || 2–3 || San Jose || OT || Murray || 17,562 || 2–1 || Recap
|- style="background:#cfc;"
| 4 || June 6 || Pittsburgh || 3–1 || San Jose || || Murray || 17,562 || 3–1 || Recap
|- style="background:#fcf;"
| 5 || June 9 || San Jose || 4–2 || Pittsburgh || || Murray || 18,680 || 3–2 || Recap 
|- style="background:#cff;"
| 6 || June 12 || Pittsburgh || 3–1 || San Jose || || Murray || 17,562 || 4–2 || Recap
|-

|- 
| ''Legend:       = Win       = Loss       = Playoff series win

Injuries

Suspensions

Post-season

Injuries

Statistics
Final

Skaters

 Team Total includes Skater Statistics, Goaltender Statistics and Bench Minor Penalties.

Goaltenders

†Denotes player spent time with another team before joining the Penguins.  Stats reflect time with the Penguins only.
‡Denotes player was traded mid-season.  Stats reflect time with the Penguins only.

Notable achievements

Awards

Team awards 
Awarded week of March 27

Milestones

Transactions
The Penguins have been involved in the following transactions during the 2015–16 season:

Trades

Notes
Toronto to retain 15% ($1.25 million) of salary as part of trade.
Pittsburgh to retain 33% ($1.125 million) of salary as part of trade.
Edmonton to retain 50% ($1.95 million) of salary as part of trade.

Free agents

Waivers

Signings

Other 

Notes
  – Two-way contract
  – Entry-level contract

Draft picks 

The 2015 NHL Entry Draft will be held on June 26–27, 2015 at the BB&T Center in Sunrise, Florida.

Draft notes
 The Pittsburgh Penguins first-round pick went to the Edmonton Oilers as a result of a trade on January 2, 2015 that sent David Perron to the Penguins in exchange for Rob Klinkhammer and this pick.
 The Pittsburgh Penguins third-round pick went to the Florida Panthers as a result of a trade on March 5, 2014 that sent Marcel Goc to the Penguins in exchange for a 2014 fifth-round pick (#143–Miguel Fidler) and this pick.
 The Pittsburgh Penguins fourth-round pick went to the Toronto Maple Leafs as a result of a trade on February 25, 2015 that sent Daniel Winnik to the Penguins in exchange for Zach Sill, a 2016 second-round pick, and this pick.

References 

Pittsburgh
Pittsburgh Penguins season, 2015-16
Pittsburgh Penguins seasons
Pittsburgh Penguins
Pittsburgh Penguins
Eastern Conference (NHL) championship seasons
Stanley Cup championship seasons
Pittsburgh